"She Just Started Liking Cheatin' Songs" is a song written by Kent Robbins and recorded by American country music artist John Anderson. It was released in March 1980 as the third single from the album John Anderson.  The song reached #13 on the Billboard Hot Country Singles & Tracks chart.

Chart performance

Alan Jackson version

Alan Jackson covered the song for his 1999 album Under the Influence. Although not released as a single, Jackson's cover charted at #72 due to unsolicited airplay.

References

1980 singles
John Anderson (musician) songs
Alan Jackson songs
Songs written by Kent Robbins
Song recordings produced by Norro Wilson
Warner Records singles
Arista Nashville singles
1980 songs